Ali Reda Fakih (born 12 April 1967) is a Lebanese football coach and former player who is the goalkeeper coach of  club Shabab Sahel.

As a player, Fakih played as a goalkeeper. During the 1996–97 season, Fakih set a world record for most consecutive minutes without conceding a goal, at 1,511 minutes. At international level, Fakih represented Lebanon at the 2000 AFC Asian Cup.

Club career 
Coming through the youth system, Fakih started his senior club career with Racing Beirut. In 1989 Fakih left Racing to join Shabab Sahel, where he played two seasons.

He played for Ansar between 1992 and 1999, winning seven Lebanese Premier League titles and five Lebanese FA Cups. Fakih is the Guinness World Record holder for most consecutive minutes without conceding a goal. He didn't concede a goal for 1,511 minutes, while keeping 16 clean sheets in the 1996–97 season, beating the record previously set by Chris Woods of Rangers.

Fakih joined Sagesse in 1999 for two years, before returning to Shabab Sahel, where he retired after playing for five seasons.

International career 
Fakih played for the Lebanon national under-23 team between 1990 and 1992. He was first called up to the senior national team in 1992, remaining a regular until 2002. He was Lebanon's first-choice goalkeeper at the 2000 AFC Asian Cup.

Managerial career 
After his retirement, Fakih became a goalkeeper coach, working at Ansar and Shabab Sahel. In 2020, Fakih is the first team manager of Third Division side Al Raya. In 2020 he was re-appointed goalkeeper coach of Shabab Sahel.

Honours 
Individual
 Lebanese Premier League Best Save: 1996–97
 Lebanese Premier League Team of the Season: 1996–97, 1997–98, 2000–01, 2001–02

See also
 List of Lebanon international footballers

References

External links
 
 
 

1967 births
Living people
People from Marjeyoun District
Lebanese footballers
Association football goalkeepers
Lebanese Premier League players
Racing Club Beirut players
Shabab Al Sahel FC players
Al Ansar FC players
Sagesse SC footballers
Lebanon youth international footballers
Lebanon international footballers
2000 AFC Asian Cup players
Lebanese football managers
Association football goalkeeping coaches